Kim Min-ki (born 21 June 1990) is a South Korean footballer who plays as a forward and is currently a free agent.

Early years
In 2006, 16-year-old Kim was selected into the Korea Football Association's Youth Project. The project sent promising youngsters to receive training abroad, and would eventually produce superstars like Son Heung-min.

Through this program, Kim trained at Série A club Palmeiras for a season. While in Brasil, in aim of achieving success there, Kim learnt to speak fluent Portuguese.

Career statistics

Club

Notes

References

1990 births
Living people
South Korean expatriate footballers
Association football midfielders
K League 2 players
Hong Kong Premier League players
Suwon FC players
Hoi King SA players
Tai Po FC players
South Korean expatriate sportspeople in Hong Kong
Expatriate footballers in Hong Kong
South Korean footballers
People from Suwon
Sportspeople from Gyeonggi Province